ŽRK Danilovgrad is a women's handball club from Danilovgrad in Montenegro. ŽRK Danilovgrad competes in the Prva Liga.

European record

Team

Current squad 

Squad for the 2016–17 season

Goalkeepers
  Anastasija Coguric
  Tea Marinović
  Darija Zecevic

Wingers
RW
  Aneta Adzic
  Milica Karapic
LW 
  Branka Konatar
Line Players 
  Jelena Scepanovic

Back players
LB
  Enisa Djokovic
  Maja Ikovic
  Tamara Jovicevic
  Ivana Novakovic
  Ana Saranovic
CB 
  Tatjana Brnovic
  Marija Terzic 
  Tamara Vukovic
RB
  Lejla Bosnjak 
  Ivana Carapic

External links

 EHF Club profile

Montenegrin handball clubs
Danilovgrad